The page lists female fellows of the Royal Academy of Engineering (FREng), elected by the Royal Academy of Engineering in the UK.

The Royal Academy of Engineering (RAEng), founded in 1976, is the youngest of the five national academies in the UK. It represents the nation's best practising engineers, innovators, and entrepreneurs, who are very often in leading roles in industry, business, and academia.  Fellowship of the RAEng is a national honour, bringing prestige to both the individual and any organisation the Fellow is associated with. In recent years between 50 and 60 new fellows have been chosen each year by peer review from nominations made by the current fellowship;. Those proposed for fellowship must come “from among eminent engineers regarded by virtue of their personal achievements in the field of engineering as being of exceptional merit and distinction”.

All 130 of the founding fellows in 1976 were men. Four women were elected in the first 20 years, the first in 1982. In all, 13 female fellows pre-date 2000, with a further 20 elected before 2010 and 65 in the decade before 2020. In 2010 the Council determined a policy that over time 10–20% of newly elected fellows should be women.
 
The Academy published a diversity and inclusion action plan for the five years from 2020  but does not regularly publish the proportion of female engineers in the current fellowship, estimated in 2019 to be less than 7%. In July 2020 it launched a campaign aimed at delivering a 'Fellowship that is Fit for the Future' by the time it celebrates its 50th anniversary in 2026 and set an aspiration that at least half of all candidates elected each year will be from under-represented target groups.

As of 2022, 131 women have been elected to Fellowship, plus nine international fellows, nine honorary fellows, and one royal fellow.

Fellows

International Fellows 

International Fellows are engineers of international distinction who are not of British nationality and who are not resident and working in Britain. The number of International Fellows cannot exceed one-tenth of the number of Fellows, and no more than ten may be elected in any year.

Honorary Fellows

Persons not being Fellows who have made or are making a distinguished contribution to the practice of engineering are eligible for election as Honorary Fellows. Their number cannot exceed fifty and no more than five may be elected in any year.

Royal Fellows 

Royal Fellows are such members of the Royal Family as on the invitation of the Board shall agree to become Royal Fellows.

References 
General

 

Specific

External links 
 
RAEng Awards Prizes and Medals

 
Royal Academy of Engineering
Royal Academy of Engineering
Royal Academy of Engineering, Fellows, Female
Royal Academy of Engineering
Royal Academy of Engineering
.